Edward Spencer Pratt, (March 22, 1856 – April 30, 1925) was an American diplomat. He was born several miles outside of Mobile, Alabama, the son of William Henry Pratt. He was educated in Europe and received a doctorate in medicine. He graduated from Columbia University in 1876. He served as Minister Resident and Consul General to Persia from 1886 to 1891. He served as Consul General to Singapore from 1893 to 1899.

References

1856 births
1925 deaths
Ambassadors of the United States to Iran
People from Mobile, Alabama
19th-century American diplomats
Columbia University alumni